The Cameroon Baptist Church  is a Baptist Christian denomination in Cameroon. It is affiliated with the Baptist World Alliance. The headquarters is in Douala.

History
The organization has its origins in a mission of the Baptist Missionary Society  in 1845 by English and Jamaican missionaries such as Joseph Jackson Fuller and Joseph Merrick. The missionary Joseph Merrick, a Jamaican, son of freed slaves, on his first arrival in 1843 takes up to spread the Gospel while promoting a spirit of independence in his preaching.

In 1886, two years after the signing of the treaty between the Germans and the Duala, when the German authorities expelled the Baptist Mission Society and transferred its work to the Basel Mission, the Native Baptist Church congregation led by Reverend Joshua Dibundu Dibue protested vigorously and stood up for their self-governing.

It was officially founded in Douala in 1888 as the Native Baptist Church.

In 1917, under French rule the Native Baptist Church was again opposed to the authority of the Paris Mission (Société des Missions Evangéliques de Paris).

Appointed as president of the Native Baptist Church in 1921, Reverend Adolf Lotin A Same continued the struggle for the local church independence. Criticized by French pastors, he was publicly deposed of his ministerial duties in 1922. Repression came hard. The Native Baptist Churches were closed down. The Reverend Lotin was forced to preach in secret. He was readmitted in 1932 but served several other jail terms, little appreciated as he was by French authorities. Generally considered as the first nationalist leader from French colonial times, this music composer left over 200 canticles written according to the ngosso rhythm. According to a denomination census released in 2020, it claimed 135 churches and 16,000 members.

References

Baptist denominations in Africa
Evangelicalism in Cameroon